Evidence of Things Unseen is an album by American jazz pianist Don Pullen recorded in 1983 for the Italian Black Saint label.

Reception
The AllMusic review awarded the album 4 stars.

Track listing
All compositions by Don Pullen
 "Evidence of Things Unseen" - 11:37
 "Victory Dance (For Sharon)" - 8:24
 "Un In the Beginning (For Nick)" - 18:03
 "Perseverance" - 4:03
 "Rejoice" - 1:00
Recorded at Vanguard Studios, New York on September 28 & 29, 1983

Personnel
Don Pullen - piano

References

Black Saint/Soul Note albums
Don Pullen albums
Solo piano jazz albums
1984 albums